Hubert Dupont (born 13 November 1980 in Lyon) is a French former professional road bicycle racer, who competed professionally between 2005 and 2019 for the R.A.G.T. Semences and  teams. His sporting career began with AC Lyon Vaise.

Major results

2003
 1st Les Monts Luberon
 1st Stage 1a (TTT) Giro della Valle d'Aosta
2004
 1st Stage 5 Giro Ciclistico d'Italia
 2nd Les Boucles du Sud Ardèche
 4th Les Monts Luberon
 8th Overall Tour des Pyrénées
2005
 4th Les Monts Luberon
 9th Overall Critérium des Espoirs
2006
 1st  Mountains classification Tour of the Basque Country
 6th Overall Route du Sud
 7th Tour du Doubs
 10th Overall Tour du Limousin
2007
 4th Tour du Doubs
2008
 6th Overall Route du Sud
2009
 5th Road race, National Road Championships
 7th GP Miguel Induráin
 10th Overall Tour de l'Ain
2012
 2nd Overall Route du Sud
 7th Overall Giro del Trentino
 9th Overall Critérium International
2013
 7th Overall Route du Sud
2016
 3rd Overall Tour du Limousin
 10th Overall Giro del Trentino
2017
 8th Grand Prix d'Ouverture La Marseillaise
 10th Overall Route du Sud
 10th Overall Tour du Limousin
2018
 7th Overall Route d'Occitanie

Grand Tour general classification results timeline

References

External links

 

French male cyclists
1980 births
Living people
Cyclists from Lyon